Megachile dorsalis is a species of bee in the family Megachilidae. It was described by Pérez in 1879.

References

Dorsalis
Insects described in 1879